The 2015–16 season is the 33rd season in Segunda División played by Real Oviedo, a Spanish football club based in Oviedo, Asturias. The team was promoted last season by winning Segunda División B

Kit
Supplier: Hummel / Sponsor: TBA

Players

Squad

Current squad
 

 (3rd captain)
 (vice-captain)

 (captain)

 (4th captain)

In

|}

Out

|}

Technical staff

Competitions

Pre-season and friendlies

Segunda División

League table

Results summary

Copa del Rey

Appearances and goals

Statistics

Goals

Discipline

See also
2015–16 Segunda División B
2015–16 Copa del Rey

References

External links

Real Oviedo
Real Oviedo seasons